The Atascosa County Courthouse is a historic courthouse built in 1912 on Circle Dr in Jourdanton, Texas. The Mission Revival Style architecture building was designed by San Antonio architect Henry T. Phelps. The building contract was awarded to the Gordon Jones Construction Co. of San Antonio, based on a bid of $65,000. It was added to the National Register of Historic Places on December 30, 1997.

Atascosa County was formed in 1856. The first Atascosa County Courthouse was a log building erected in Amphion in 1856. The second a frame building raised in Pleasanton in 1857. The county built a larger frame courthouse in 1868. The fourth courthouse, built in 1885 was made from red stone and served as the Pleasanton City Hall when the county seat was moved to Jourdanton.

The current Atascosa County Courthouse is the fifth structure to serve as the seat of Atascosa County government. The Mission Revival style courthouse has towers, balconies and a Spanish-tiled roof. It is finished in red-brown brick and cast stone. Originally, the lower floor was open for the storage of wood. It was enclosed in the late 1920s to create more office space. The courthouse sits on a circular plot of land in contrast to the typical Texas courthouse square. The Atascosa County Courthouse is the only existing Mission Revival style courthouse in Texas.

See also

National Register of Historic Places listings in Atascosa County, Texas
List of county courthouses in Texas

References

External links

County courthouses in Texas
Courthouses on the National Register of Historic Places in Texas
Buildings and structures in Atascosa County, Texas
Mission Revival architecture in Texas
National Register of Historic Places in Atascosa County, Texas
Texas State Antiquities Landmarks
Government buildings completed in 1912
1912 establishments in Texas